Gastank was an English television show that aired from 1982–1983 in the United Kingdom on Channel 4. Hosted by former Yes keyboardist Rick Wakeman, along with keyboardist Tony Ashton, the show featured a mix of interviews with 1970s musicians and impromptu performances where the guest artist would join Wakeman and his house band in playing re-arranged versions of their classic songs or entirely new pieces, created for the show. The format was very informal with the setting likened to a bar, where Wakeman would interview the guest over a drink or two, followed by their performance, in front of a small studio audience, sitting in groups at tables. Wakeman would frequently cite the show as an opportunity for musicians from different bands to get the opportunity to work together. During its run, the show featured guests as diverse as Ian Paice, Steve Hackett, Andy Fairweather Low, John Entwistle, Godley and Creme, Eric Burdon, Phil Lynott and Steve Hackett.

The house band for the show was Rick Wakeman (keyboards), Tony Ashton (keyboards & vocals), Chas Cronk (bass, episodes 1-3, 5 & 6), Jerome Rimson (bass, episodes 1-4), Tony Fernandez (drums).

As of August 2020, all full episodes and selected individual performances are available on YouTube.

Episodes

Episode 1

Guests.
 Rick Parfitt
 The Cimarons
 Eric Burdon & Alvin Lee

Music.
 Rick Parfitt:  Little Lady
 Rick Parfitt:  Rain
 Rick Wakeman:  Catherine Howard
 The Cimarons:  He Give Up To I
 Tony Ashton:  Cigarettes!
 Eric Burdon & Alvin Lee:  Heart Attack
 Eric Burdon & Alvin Lee:  Trying To Get Back To You
 Eric Burdon & Alvin Lee:  Rock and Roll Medley

Interviews.
 Rick Parfitt
 Eric Burdon

Episode 2

Guests.
 Andy Fairweather Low
 Kevin Godley & Lol Creme
 Ronnie Scott
 Maggie Bell

Music.
 Tony Ashton:  Aeroplane
 Andy Fairweather Low:  Man Smart, Woman Smarter
 Andy Fairweather Low, Kevin Godley & Lol Creme:  Wide Eyed and Legless, In the Midnight Hour
 Ronnie Scott:  Gerrard Street
 Rick Wakeman:  Catherine Parr
 Maggie Bell:  Blackpool's First Twist Victim
 Maggie Bell:  Crazy

Interviews.
 Kevin Godley & Lol Creme
 Andy Fairweather Low
 Ronnie Scott

Episode 3

Guests.
 Phil Lynott & John Sykes
 Donovan
 Chris Farlowe & Alvin Lee
 Rick Parfitt
 Ian Paice

Music.
 Tony Ashton:  TV Set
 Phil Lynott & John Sykes:  Growing Up
 Phil Lynott & John Sykes:  The Man's A Fool
 Rick Wakeman & Tony Ashton:  Keyboard Ad-lib
 Donovan:  Mellow Yellow
 Donovan:  Lalena
 Chris Farlowe & Alvin Lee:  Staring Outta Windows
 Chris Farlowe & Alvin Lee:  Stormy Monday Blues
 Chris Farlowe, Alvin Lee, Rick Parfitt, Ian Paice:  Lucille

Interviews.
 Chris Farlowe

Episode 4

Guests.
 Steve Harley
 The Strawbs
 John Entwistle
 Rick Parfitt
 Ian Paice

Music.
 Steve Harley:  Mr. Soft
 The Strawbs:  The Hangman and the Papist
 John Entwistle:  Twist and Shout
 Rick Wakeman:  Elgin Mansions
 Tony Ashton:  It's Weird
 John Entwistle & Steve Harley:  Go America

Interviews.
 Steve Harley
 Dave Cousins (The Strawbs)
 John Entwistle

Episode 5

Guests.
 Alvin Lee
 Ian Paice
 Howie Casey
 Suzi Quatro
 Steve Hackett

Music.
 Alvin Lee:  I May Be Wrong
 Alvin Lee:  Tell Me Baby
 Ian Paice & Howie Casey:  Resurrection Shuffle
 Ian Paice & Howie Casey:  Possibly
 Suzi Quatro & Steve Hackett:  My Babe
 Suzi Quatro & Steve Hackett:  CC Rider
 Suzi Quatro & Steve Hackett:  Sweet Little Rock 'n' Roller

Interviews.
 Alvin Lee
 Ian Paice
 Suzi Quatro

Episode 6

Guests.
 Roy Wood
 Frankie Miller
 Howie Casey
 The Cimarons
 Steve Hackett

Music.
 Roy Wood:  California Man
 Roy Wood:  Down To Zero
 Rick Wakeman:  Gone But Not Forgotten
 Frankie Miller & Howie Casey:  He'll Have To Go
 The Cimarons:  My Soul Wants To Be With Jah
 Steve Hackett:  Camino Royale (Hackett To Pieces)
 Steve Hackett:  Hackett's Boogie

Interviews.
 Roy Wood
 Steve Hackett

References 

1982 British television series debuts
1983 British television series endings
1980s British music television series
Channel 4 original programming